Steraspis is a genus of beetles in the family Buprestidae, containing the following species:

 Steraspis aeruginosa Klug, 1855
 Steraspis ambigua (Fåhraeus in Boheman, 1851)
 Steraspis ambiguoides Kerremans, 1908
 Steraspis amplipennis (Fåhraeus in Boheman, 1851)
 Steraspis argodi Théry, 1901
 Steraspis brevicornis (Klug, 1835)
 Steraspis calida Harold, 1878
 Steraspis ceardi Théry, 1930
 Steraspis colossa Harold, 1878
 Steraspis confusa Bellamy, 2004
 Steraspis cupriventris Kerremans, 1914
 Steraspis divina Kerremans, 1914
 Steraspis fastuosa Gerstäcker, 1871
 Steraspis hacquardi Théry, 1932
 Steraspis hebe Kerremans, 1914
 Steraspis humeralis Kerremans, 1910
 Steraspis hyaena Thomson, 1879
 Steraspis infuscata Théry, 1908
 Steraspis jackal Thomson, 1879
 Steraspis lacustris Kerremans, 1914
 Steraspis laeviventris Kerremans, 1914
 Steraspis lesnei Kerremans, 1908
 Steraspis maunensis Obenberger, 1935
 Steraspis mimosarum Kerremans, 1907
 Steraspis modesta Kerremans, 1895
 Steraspis monardi Théry, 1946
 Steraspis nigella Kerremans, 1914
 Steraspis nigriventris Kerremans, 1914
 Steraspis ovalis Kerremans, 1914
 Steraspis parallelipennis Obenberger, 1926
 Steraspis piliventris Kerremans, 1914
 Steraspis reptilis Thomson, 1897
 Steraspis rotundata Kerremans, 1914
 Steraspis scabra (Fabricius, 1775)
 Steraspis scapha Kerremans, 1914
 Steraspis schultzei Kerremans, 1908
 Steraspis speciosa (Klug, 1829)
 Steraspis squamosa (Klug, 1829)
 Steraspis staudingeri Kerremans, 1900
 Steraspis subbrevicornis Thomson, 1879
 Steraspis viridicincta Kerremans, 1914
 Steraspis welwitschii Saunders, 1872

References

Buprestidae genera